Route 515, or Highway 515, may refer to:

Afghanistan
Route 515 (Afghanistan) in Farah Province

Canada
 Alberta Highway 515
 New Brunswick Route 515
 Ontario Highway 515 (former)

India
 National Highway 515 (India)

United Kingdom
 A515 road

United States
  Interstate 515 (concurrent with U.S. routes 93 and 95)
  Lake County, California County Route 515
  Brevard, Florida County Route 515
  Georgia State Route 515
  Maryland Route 515
  County Route 515 (New Jersey)
  North Carolina Highway 515 (former)
  Ohio State Route 515
  Pennsylvania Route 515 (former)
  Virginia State Route 515 (former)
  Washington State Route 515
Territories
  Puerto Rico Highway 515